The 1912 All-Ireland Senior Football Championship was the 26th staging of Ireland's premier Gaelic football knock-out competition. The Munster Quarter-Final Kerry ended Cork's All Ireland title. Louth were the winners.

Results

Connacht Senior Football Championship

Leinster Senior Football Championship

Munster Senior Football Championship

Ulster Senior Football Championship

All-Ireland Senior Football Championship
By the time the semi-final was to be played, the Leinster championship was not finished, so Dublin were nominated to represent Leinster. When Louth beat Dublin in the Leinster final, they were given Dublin's place in the All-Ireland final.

Championship statistics

Miscellaneous
 Louth win their second All Ireland football title.

References